This is the discography for American double bassist Ron Carter.

As leader/co-leader 

 Where? (New Jazz, 1961)
 Uptown Conversation (Embryo, 1970) – live
 Alone Together with Jim Hall (Milestone, 1973) – live
 Blues Farm (CTI, 1973)
 All Blues (CTI, 1974)
 Spanish Blue (CTI, 1975)
 Anything Goes (Kudu, 1975)
 Yellow & Green (CTI, 1976)
 Pastels (Milestone, 1976)
 Piccolo (Milestone, 1976) – live
 Third Plane (Milestone, 1977)
 Peg Leg (Milestone, 1978)
 A Song for You (Milestone, 1978)
 1 + 3 with Hank Jones or Herbie Hancock and Tony Williams (JVC, 1979) – live
 Carnaval with Sadao Watanabe, Hank Jones and Tony Williams (Galaxy, 1983) – live
 Pick 'Em (Milestone, 1980)
 Parade (Milestone, 1980)
 New York Slick (Milestone, 1980)
 Patrão (Milestone, 1981)
 Parfait (Milestone, 1982)
 Empire Jazz (RSO, 1980)
 Super Strings (Milestone, 1981)
 Heart & Soul with Cedar Walton (Timeless, 1982)
 Etudes (Elektra Musician, 1983)
 Live at Village West  with Jim Hall (Concord Jazz, 1984) – live
 Telephone with Jim Hall (Concord Jazz, 1985) – live
 Plays Bach (Phillips, 1987)
 The Puzzle (SMS, 1986)
 Very Well (Polydor Deep Moat, 1987)
 All Alone (EmArcy, 1988)
 1989: Something in Common with Houston Person (Muse, 1990)
 1989: Duets with Helen Merrill  (EmArcy, 1989)
 Now's the Time with Houston Person (Muse, 1990)
 Eight Plus (Victor, 1990)
 Panamanhattan with Richard Galliano (Dreyfus Jazz, 1991) – live
 Meets Bach (Blue Note, 1992)
 Friends (Blue Note, 1993)
 A Tribute to Miles with Herbie Hancock, Wayne Shorter, Tony Williams, Wallace Roney (Qwest, 1994)
 Jazz, My Romance (Blue Note, 1994)
 Mr. Bow-tie (Blue Note, 1995)
 Brandenburg Concerto (Blue Note, 1995)
 The Bass and I (Blue Note, 1997)
 So What? (Blue Note, 1998)
 Orfeu (Blue Note, 1999)
 Holiday in Rio (Blue Note, 2001)
 When Skies Are Grey... (Blue Note, 2001) – live
 Dialogues with Houston Person (HighNote, 2002)
 Stardust (Blue Note, 2001)
 The Golden Striker (Blue Note, 2003)
 Just Between Friends with Houston Person (HighNote, 2008)
 Dear Miles (Blue Note, 2007)
 It's the Time (Blue Note, 2007)
 Jazz & Bossa (Blue Note, 2008)[3CD]
 The World of Ron Carter (Somethin' Else, 2009)
 Ron Carter's Great Big Band (Sunnyside, 2011)
 Cocktails At The Cotton Club (Somethin' Else, 2013)
 In Memory of Jim with Larry Coryell and Peter Bernstein (Somethin' Else, 2014)
 Chemistry with Houston Person (HighNote, 2016)
 An Evening with Ron Carter & Richard Galliano with Richard Galliano (In+Out, 2017) – live
 Remember Love with Houston Person (HighNote, 2018)
 Skyline with Jack DeJohnette, Gonzalo Rubalcaba (5Passion, 2021) – Grammy won album
 The Brown Beatnik Tomes with Danny Simmons (Blue Note, 2019) – live
  2019: Remembering Bob Freedman (Shanti Music, 2021) – live, Grammy nominated album
 Finding The Right Notes (In+Out, 2022)

As sideman 
With Pepper Adams
 The Adams Effect (Uptown, 1988)
 Mean What You Say with Thad Jones (Milestone, 1966)
 Encounter! (Prestige, 1969)

With Nat Adderley
 Calling Out Loud (CTI, 1968)
 A Little New York Midtown Music (Galaxy, 1979)

With Geri Allen
 Twenty One (Blue Note, 1994)
 Timeless Portraits and Dreams (Telarc, 2006)

With Gene Ammons
 The Black Cat! (Prestige, 1971)
 My Way (Prestige, 1971)
 Got My Own (Prestige, 1972)
 Big Bad Jug (Prestige, 1973)

With Roy Ayers
 Stoned Soul Picnic (Atlantic, 1968)
 Daddy Bug (Atlantic, 1969)

With Chet Baker
 She Was Too Good to Me (CTI, 1974)
 Carnegie Hall Concert with Gerry Mulligan (CTI, 1975) – live
 You Can't Go Home Again (Horizon, 1977) 
 Once Upon a Summertime (Artists House, 1980)
 The Best Thing for You (A&M, 1989)

With Gato Barbieri
 Fenix (Flying Dutchman, 1971)
 Chapter Three: Viva Emiliano Zapata (Impulse!, 1974)
 Yesterdays (Flying Dutchman, 1974)
 Chapter Four: Alive in New York (Impulse!, 1975) – live

With Joey Baron
 Down Home with Arthur Blythe and Bill Frisell (Intuition, 1997)
 We'll Soon Find Out with Arthur Blythe and Bill Frisell (Intuition, 1999)

With George Benson
 Giblet Gravy (Verve, 1968)
 Shape of Things to Come (A&M, 1968)
 The Other Side of Abbey Road (A&M, 1970) – recorded in 1969
 Beyond the Blue Horizon (CTI, 1971)
 White Rabbit (CTI, 1972) – recorded in 1971
 Body Talk (CTI, 1973)
 Bad Benson (CTI, 1974)
 Tenderly (Warner Bros., 1989)
 Big Boss Band (Warner Bros., 1990)

With Cindy Blackman
 The Oracle (Muse, 1995)
 In the Now (HighNote, 1998)

With Ray Bryant
 Up Above the Rock (Cadet, 1968)
 MCMLXX (Atlantic, 1970)

With Kenny Burrell
 Guitar Forms (Verve, 1964)
 A Generation Ago Today (Verve, 1967)
 Blues – The Common Ground (Verve, 1968)
 Night Song (Verve, 1969)
 God Bless the Child (CTI, 1971)
 Togethering with Grover Washington Jr. (Blue Note, 1984)

With Jaki Byard
 Here's Jaki (New Jazz, 1961)
 Hi-Fly (New Jazz, 1962)
 Out Front! (Prestige, 1964)
 Jaki Byard with Strings! (Prestige, 1968)

With Donald Byrd
 Electric Byrd (Blue Note, 1970)
 Kofi (Blue Note, 1995) – recorded in 1969–70

With Alice Coltrane
 Huntington Ashram Monastery (Impulse!, 1969)
 Ptah, The El Daoud (Impulse!, 1970)

With Hank Crawford
 Mr. Blues Plays Lady Soul (Atlantic, 1969)
 It's a Funky Thing to Do (Cotillion, 1971)
 Help Me Make it Through the Night (Kudu, 1972)
 We Got a Good Thing Going (Kudu, 1972)

With Miles Davis
 Quiet Nights (Columbia, 1962)
 Seven Steps to Heaven (Columbia, 1963)
 Miles Davis in Europe (Columbia, 1964) – live
 Live at the 1963 Monterey Jazz Festival (Monterey Jazz Festival, 2003) – live
 My Funny Valentine (Columbia, 1965) – live
 Four & More (Columbia, 1966) – live
 Miles in Berlin (Columbia, 1965) – live
 Miles in Tokyo (CBS, 1969) – live
 Live at the Plugged Nickel (Columbia, 1995) – live
 ESP (Columbia, 1965)
 Miles Smiles (Columbia, 1967)
 Sorcerer (Columbia, 1967)
 Nefertiti (Columbia, 1968)
 Miles in the Sky (Columbia, 1968)
 Filles de Kilimanjaro (Columbia, 1969)
 Live-Evil (Columbia, 1971) – partially live
 Big Fun (Columbia, 1974)
 Water Babies (Columbia, 1976)
 Circle in the Round (Columbia, 1979)
 Direction (Columbia, 1981)
 Live in Milan 1964 (RLR, 2007)

With Paul Desmond
 Summertime (CTI, 1968)
 From the Hot Afternoon (CTI, 1969)
 Bridge Over Troubled Water (CTI, 1970)
 Skylark (CTI, 1973)
 Pure Desmond (CTI, 1975)

With Eric Dolphy
 Out There (Prestige, 1961)
 Far Cry (Prestige, 1962)

With Lou Donaldson
 Lush Life (Blue Note, 1980)
 Sophisticated Lou (Blue Note, 1973)

With Don Ellis
 How Time Passes (Candid, 1960)
 New Ideas (New Jazz, 1961)

With Roberta Flack
 First Take (Atlantic, 1969)
 Quiet Fire (Atlantic, 1971)
 Killing Me Softly (Atlantic, 1973)

With Tommy Flanagan
 The Master Trio (Baybridge, 1983)
 Blues in the Closet (Baybridge, 1983)

With Michael Franks
 Tiger in the Rain (Warner Bros. Records, 1979)
 Skin Dive (Warner Bros., 1985)

With Letizia Gambi
 Introducing Letizia Gambi (Jando Music S.r.l., 2012)
 Blue Monday (RP Production, 2016)

With Red Garland
 Red Alert (Galaxy, 1978)
 Crossings (Galaxy, 1978)
 Stepping Out (Galaxy, 1981)
 So Long Blues (Galaxy, 1984)
 Strike Up the Band (Galaxy, 1981)

With Stan Getz
 Voices (Verve, 1967)
 Sweet Rain (Verve, 1967)
 What the World Needs Now: Stan Getz Plays Burt Bacharach and Hal David (Verve, 1968) – recorded in 1966-68
 Stan Getz & Bill Evans (Verve, 1973) – recorded in 1964

With Gerry Gibbs
 Thrasher Dream Trio with Kenny Barron (Whaling City Sound, 2013)
 We're Back with Kenny Barron (Whaling City Sound, 2014)
 Live in Studio with Kenny Barron (Whaling City Sound, 2015)

With Benny Golson
 Pop + Jazz = Swing (Audio Fidelity, 1961) – also released as Just Jazz!
 Free (Argo, 1962)
 This Is for You, John (Baystate, 1984)
 Stardust (Denon, 1987) with Freddie Hubbard
 One Day, Forever (Arkadia Jazz, 2001) – recorded in 1999

With Johnny Griffin
 White Gardenia (Riverside, 1961)
 The Kerry Dancers (Riverside, 1962)

With Jim Hall
 Concierto (CTI, 1975)
 Commitment (A&M, 1976)
 Live at Village West (Concord Jazz, 1984)
 Telephone (Concord Jazz, 1985)

With Johnny Hammond
 Wild Horses Rock Steady (Kudu, 1971)
 The Prophet (Kudu, 1972)
 Higher Ground (Kudu, 1973)

With Herbie Hancock
 Empyrean Isles (Blue Note, 1964)
 Maiden Voyage (Blue Note, 1965)
 Speak Like a Child (Blue Note, 1968)
 V.S.O.P. (Columbia, 1977) – recorded in 1976
 Quartet (Columbia, 1982) – recorded in 1981

With Eddie Harris
 The In Sound (Atlantic, 1965)
 Mean Greens (Atlantic, 1966)
 The Tender Storm (Atlantic, 1966)
 Plug Me In (Atlantic, 1968)
 Excursions (Atlantic, 1966–73)
 How Can You Live Like That? (Atlantic, 1976)

With Coleman Hawkins
 Night Hawk (Swingville, 1960)
 The Hawk Relaxes (Moodsville, 1961)

With Joe Henderson
 Mode for Joe (Blue Note, 1966)
 The Kicker (Milestone, 1968)
 Tetragon (Milestone, 1968)
 Power to the People (Milestone, 1969)
 Black Is the Color (Milestone, 1972)
 Black Miracle (Milestone, 1976)
 Mirror Mirror (MPS, 1980)
 The State of the Tenor, Vols. 1 & 2 (Blue Note, 1985)

With Andrew Hill
 Grass Roots (Blue Note, 1968)
 Lift Every Voice (Blue Note, 1969)
 Passing Ships (Blue Note, 1969)

With Johnny Hodges
 Rippin' & Runnin' (Verve, 1968)
 3 Shades of Blue (Flying Dutchman, 1970)

With Freddie Hubbard
 Red Clay (CTI, 1970)
 Straight Life (CTI, 1970)
 First Light (CTI, 1971)
 Freddie Hubbard/Stanley Turrentine in Concert Volume One (CTI, 1973)
 In Concert Volume Two (CTI, 1973)

With Bobby Hutcherson
 Components (Blue Note, 1965)
 Acoustic Masters II (Atlantic, 1994)

With Milt Jackson
 Big Bags (Riverside, 1962)
 Invitation (Riverside, 1962)
 Milt Jackson at the Museum of Modern Art (Limelight, 1965) – live
 Milt Jackson and the Hip String Quartet (Verve, 1968)
 Sunflower (CTI, 1973) – recorded in 1972
 Goodbye (CTI, 1974) – recorded in 1972-73
 Olinga (CTI, 1974)

With Antonio Carlos Jobim
 Wave (A&M, 1967)
 Tide (A&M, 1970)
 Stone Flower (CTI, 1970)

With J. J. Johnson
 The Total J.J. Johnson (RCA Victor, 1967) – recorded in 1966
 Pinnacles (Milestone, 1980) – recorded in 1979

With Hank Jones
 Hanky Panky (East Wind, 1975)
 I'm Old Fashioned (East Wind, 1976) with Sadao Watanabe and The Great Jazz Trio
 The Great Jazz Trio at the Village Vanguard (East Wind, 1977) as The Great Jazz Trio
 The Great Jazz Trio at the Village Vanguard Vol. 2 (East Wind, 1977) as The Great Jazz Trio
 The Great Jazz Trio at the Village Vanguard Again (East Wind, 1981) as The Great Jazz Trio – recorded in 1977
 Kindness Joy Love & Happiness (East Wind, 1977) as The Great Jazz Trio
 Direct from L.A. (East Wind, 1977) as The Great Jazz Trio
 Milestones (East Wind, 1978) as The Great Jazz Trio
 New Wine in Old Bottles (East Wind, 1978) with Jackie McLean and the Great Jazz Trio

With Ivan "Boogaloo Joe" Jones
 Introducing the Psychedelic Soul Jazz Guitar of Joe Jones (Prestige, 1968) – recorded in 1967
 Black Whip (Prestige, 1973)

With Hubert Laws
 Laws' Cause (Atlantic, 1969) – recorded in 1968
 Crying Song (CTI, 1969)
 Afro-Classic (CTI, 1970)
 The Rite of Spring (CTI, 1971)
 Wild Flower (Atlantic, 1972) – recorded in 1971-72
 Morning Star (CTI, 1972)
 Carnegie Hall (CTI, 1973) – live
 In the Beginning (CTI, 1974)
 The Chicago Theme (CTI, 1975)

With Harold Mabern
 Straight Street (DIW, 1989)
 The Leading Man (DIW, 1993)

With Herbie Mann
 Glory of Love (CTI, 1968) – recorded in 1967
 Concerto Grosso in D Blues (Atlantic, 1969) – recorded in 1968
 Stone Flute (Embryo, 1970) – recorded in 1968

With Les McCann
 Much Les (Atlantic, 1969)
 Comment (Atlantic, 1970)

With Bette Midler
 The Divine Miss M (Atlantic, 1972) – recorded in 1971-72
 Some People's Lives (Atlantic, 1990)
 Bathhouse Betty (Warner Bros., 1998) – recorded in 1997-98

With Buddy Montgomery
 Ties of Love (Landmark, 1987)
 So Why Not? (Landmark, 1988)

With Wes Montgomery
 SO Much Guitar! (Riverside, 1961)
 Tequila (Verve, 1966)
 A Day in the Life (A&M, 1967)
 Down Here on the Ground (A&M, 1968)

With Frank Morgan
 Yardbird Suite (Contemporary, 1988)
 Reflections (Contemporary, 1989)
 Listen to the Dawn (Antilles, 1994)

With Oliver Nelson
 Sound Pieces (Impulse!, 1967) – recorded in 1966
 Happenings (Impulse!, 1966)
 Encyclopedia of Jazz (Verve, 1966)
 The Sound of Feeling (Verve, 1966)

With David "Fathead" Newman
 The Many Facets of David Newman (Atlantic, 1969) – recorded in 1968-69
 Newmanism (Atlantic, 1974)
 Mr. Fathead (Warner Bros., 1976)
 Scratch My Back (Prestige, 1979)
 Mr. Gentle Mr. Cool (Kokopelli, 1994)

With Hermeto Pascoal
 Hermeto (Cobblestone, 1970)
 Slaves Mass (Warner Bros., 1976)

With Art Pepper
 So in Love (Artists House, 1980) – recorded in 1979
 New York Album (Galaxy, 1985) – recorded in 1979

With Esther Phillips
 Alone Again, Naturally (Kudu, 1972)
 Black-Eyed Blues (Kudu, 1973)

With The Rascals
 Once Upon a Dream (Atlantic, 1968)
 See (Atlantic, 1969)
 Peaceful World (Columbia, 1971)

With Sam Rivers
 Fuchsia Swing Song (Blue Note, 1964)
 Contours (Blue Note, 1965)

With Wallace Roney
 Intuition (Muse, 1988)
 Crunchin' (Muse, 1993)

With Shirley Scott
 On a Clear Day (Impulse!, 1966)
 Mystical Lady (Cadet, 1971)
 Superstition (Cadet, 1973)

With Don Sebesky
 Giant Box (CTI, 1973)
 The Rape of El Morro (CTI, 1975)

With Woody Shaw
 In the Beginning (Muse, 1983) – recorded in 1965
 Blackstone Legacy (Contemporary, 1970)

With Wayne Shorter
 Speak No Evil (Blue Note, 1964)
 The Soothsayer (Blue Note, 1965)
 The All Seeing Eye (Blue Note, 1965)
 Schizophrenia (Blue Note, 1967)
 Moto Grosso Feio (Blue Note, 1970)
 Odyssey of Iska (Blue Note, 1970)

With Horace Silver
 Silver 'n Brass (Blue Note, 1975)
 Silver 'n Wood (Blue Note, 1976)
 Silver 'n Voices (Blue Note, 1976)
 Silver 'n Percussion (Blue Note, 1977)
 Silver 'n Strings Play the Music of the Spheres (Blue Note, 1978)
 The Hardbop Grandpop (Impulse!, 1996)
 A Prescription for the Blues (Impulse!, 1997)

With Jimmy Smith
 Got My Mojo Workin' (Verve, 1966)
 Off the Top  (Elektra Musician, 1982)

With James Spaulding
 Gotstabe a Better Way! (Muse, 1990) – recorded in 1988
 Brilliant Corners (Muse, 1988)

With Gábor Szabó
 Spellbinder (Impulse!, 1966)
 Mizrab (CTI, 1972)

With The Manhattan Transfer
 Jukin' (Capitol, 1971)
 Vocalese (Atlantic, 1985)

With Bobby Timmons
 In Person (Riverside, 1961) – live
 Born to Be Blue! (Riverside, 1963)
 The Soul Man! (Prestige, 1966)
 Got to Get It! (Milestone, 1967)

With Stanley Turrentine
 Let It Go (Impulse!, 1966) 
 Sugar (CTI, 1970) 
 The Man with the Sad Face (Fantasy, 1976)
 Nightwings (Fantasy, 1977)
 More Than a Mood (MusicMasters, 1992)
 If I Could (MusicMasters, 1993)

With McCoy Tyner
 The Real McCoy (Blue Note, 1967)
 Expansions (Blue Note, 1970)
 Extensions (Blue Note, 1973) – recorded in 1970
 Trident (Milestone, 1975)
 Fly with the Wind (Milestone, 1976)
 Supertrios (Milestone, 1977)
 Passion Dance (Milestone, 1978)
 13th House (Milestone, 1981) – recorded in 1980
 New York Reunion (Chesky, 1991)
 Counterpoints (Milestone, 2004) – recorded in 1978

With Cedar Walton
 The All American Trio with Jack DeJohnette (Baystate, 1984)
 Cedar Walton Plays (Delos, 1986)
 Roots (Astor Place, 1997)

With Grover Washington Jr.
 Inner City Blues (Kudu, 1972) – recorded in 1971
 All the King's Horses (Kudu, 1972)
 Soul Box (Kudu, 1973)
 Aria (Sony Classical, 2000) – recorded in 1999

With Randy Weston
 Uhuru Afrika (Roulette, 1961)
 Blue Moses (CTI, 1972)
 Tanjah (Polydor, 1974)

With Vanessa Williams
 The Sweetest Days (Mercury, 1994)
 Star Bright (Mercury, 1996)

With Kai Winding
 The Incredible Kai Winding Trombones (Impulse!, 1960)
 Penny Lane & Time (Verve, 1967)
 Israel with J. J. Johnson (A&M, 1968)
 Betwixt & Between with J. J. Johnson (A&M, 1969)
 Stonebone with J. J. Johnson (A&M, 1969)

With others
 Toshiko Akiyoshi, Toshiko at Top of the Gate (Nippon Columbia, 1968) – live
 Eric Alexander, Nightlife in Tokyo (Milestone, 2003) – rec. 2002
 Noah Baerman, Patch Kit (CD Baby, 2006) also with Ben Riley
 Kenny Barron, 1+1+1 (BlackHawk, 1986) – rec. 1984
 Gary Bartz, Harlem Bush Music (Milestone, 1997) – rec. 1970–71
 Terence Blanchard, Magnetic (Blue Note, 2013)
 Bob Brookmeyer, Bob Brookmeyer and Friends (Columbia, 1964)
 Henry Butler, The Village (Impulse!, 1987)
 Jonathan Butler, Head to Head (Mercury, 1993)
 Benny Carter, Central City Sketches (MusicMasters, 1987)
 Billy Cobham, Spectrum (Atlantic, 1973)
 Harry Connick, Jr., Harry Connick Jr. (Columbia, 1987)
 Chick Corea, Inner Space (Atlantic, 1973) – compilation
 A. J. Croce, A. J. Croce (Private Music, 1993)
 Tadd Dameron, The Magic Touch (Riverside, 1962)
 Eli Degibri, Israeli Song (Anzic, 2010)
 Charles Earland, Kharma (Prestige, 1974)
 Bill Evans, Loose Blues (Milestone, 1982)
 Art Farmer, The Many Faces of Art Farmer (Scepter, 1964)
 Aretha Franklin, Soul '69 (Atlantic, 1969)
 Bill Frisell, Bill Frisell, Ron Carter, Paul Motian (Nonesuch, 2006)
 Johnny Frigo, Live from Studio A in New York City (Chesky, 1988) – live
 Terry Garthwaite, Terry (Arista, 1975)
 Astrud Gilberto, Gilberto with Turrentine with Stanley Turrentine (CTI, 1971)
 Giorgio, Party of the Century (Lettera A, 2010)
 Dexter Gordon, Landslide (Blue Note, 1980) – rec. 1961-62
 Chico Hamilton, The Further Adventures of El Chico (Impulse!, 1966)
 Barry Harris, Magnificent! (Prestige, 1969)
 Gene Harris, Gene Harris of the Three Sounds (Blue Note, 1972)
 Roy Haynes, Thank You Thank You (Galaxy, 1977)
 John Hicks, Friends Old and New (Novus, 1992)
 Dan Hill, If Dreams Had Wings (Epic Records, 1980)
 Shirley Horn, I Remember Miles (Verve, 1998)
 Janis Ian, Night Rains (Columbia Records, 1979)
 Ethan Iverson, The Purity of the Turf (Criss Cross Jazz, 2016)
 Jackie and Roy, Time & Love (CTI, 1972)
 Billy Joel, The Bridge (Columbia, 1986) – rec. 1985-86
 Philly Joe Jones, Philly Mignon (Galaxy, 1977)
 Quincy Jones, Gula Matari (CTI, 1970)
 Sam Jones, Down Home (Riverside, 1962)
 Eddie Kendricks, Vintage '78 (Arista, 1978)
 Lee Konitz, Spirits (Milestone, 1971)
 Steve Kuhn and Gary McFarland, The October Suite (Impulse!, 1967) – rec. 1966
 Yusef Lateef, The Three Faces of Yusef Lateef (Riverside, 1960)
 Mike LeDonne, Night Song (Savant, 2005)
 Mel Lewis, Mel Lewis and Friends (A&M, 1977)
 Johnny Lytle, The Soulful Rebel (Milestone, 1971)
 Junior Mance, Happy Time (Jazzland, 1962)
 Arif Mardin, Journey (Atlantic, 1974) – rec. 1973
 Jon Mark, Songs for a Friend (Columbia, 1975)
 Gene McDaniels, Outlaw (Atlantic, 1970)
 Howard McGhee, Dusty Blue (Bethlehem, 1960)
 Ken McIntyre, Year of the Iron Sheep (United Artists, 1962)
 Charles McPherson, Charles McPherson (Mainstream, 1971)
 Meeco, Amargo Mel (Connector, 2009)
 Helen Merrill, Duets (EmArcy, 1987)
 James Moody, The Blues and Other Colors (Milestone, 1969)
 Airto Moreira, Free (CTI, 1972)
 Idris Muhammad, Peace and Rhythm (Prestige, 1971)
 Geoff Muldaur, Is Having a Wonderful Time (Reprise, 1975)
 Mark Murphy, Bridging a Gap (Muse, 1973) – rec. 1972
 Aaron Neville, Nature Boy: The Standards Album (Verve, 2003)
 New York Jazz Quartet, In Concert in Japan (Salvation, 1975)
 Rosa Passos, Entre Amigos (Chesky, 2003)
 Nicholas Payton, Smoke Sessions (Smoke Sessions, 2021)
 Duke Pearson, Sweet Honey Bee (Blue Note, 1966)
 Houston Person, Sweet Buns & Barbeque (Prestige, 1973) – rec. 1972
 Austin Peralta, Maiden Voyage (Eighty-Eight's, 2006) – rec. 2005
 Pony Poindexter, Pony's Express (Epic, 1962)
 Tom Rush, Tom Rush (Columbia, 1970)
 Gil Scott-Heron, Pieces of a Man (Flying Dutchman, 1972)
 Bud Shank, This Bud's for You... (Muse, 1985) – rec. 1984
 Marlena Shaw, From the Depths of My Soul (Blue Note, 1973)
 Archie Shepp, The Way Ahead (Impulse!, 1969)
 Janis Siegel, Experiment in White (Atlantic Records, 1982)
 Paul Simon, Paul Simon (Columbia, 1972)
 Grace Slick, Manhole  (RCA, 1974) – rec. 1973
 Lonnie Smith, Mama Wailer (Kudu, 1971)
 Phoebe Snow, Second Childhood (Columbia, 1976)
 Candi Staton, Candi Staton (Warner Bros., 1980)
 Sonny Stitt, Satan (Cadet, 1974)
 Ed Summerlin, Ring Out Joy (Avant-Garde, 1968)
 Buddy Terry, Electric Soul! (Prestige, 1967)
 Ed Thigpen, Out of the Storm (Verve, 1966)
 Charles Tolliver, Paper Man (Freedom, 1968)
 A Tribe Called Quest, The Low End Theory (Jive, 1991) – rec. 1990-91
 Kenny Vance, Vance 32 (Atlantic Records, 1975)
 Mal Waldron, The Quest (New Jazz, 1962) – rec. 1961
 The Tony Williams Lifetime, Ego (Polydor, 1971)
 Leo Wright, Suddenly the Blues (Atlantic, 1962)

References

Discographies of American artists
Jazz discographies